In mathematics, the Faxén integral (also named Faxén function) is the following integral

The integral is named after the Swedish physicist Olov Hilding Faxén, who published it in 1921 in his PhD thesis.

n-dimensional Faxén integral 
More generally one defines the -dimensional Faxén integral as

with
 and 

The parameter  is only for convenience in calculations.

Properties
Let  denote the Gamma function, then

For  one has the following relationship to the Scorer function

Asymptotics 
For  we have the following asymptotics

References

Mathematical analysis
Functions and mappings
Definitions of mathematical integration